The Rondeau River is a tributary of the Jacquot River flowing in the municipality of Saint-Léonard-de-Portneuf, in the MRC Portneuf Regional County Municipality, in the administrative region of Capitale-Nationale, in Quebec, in Canada.

The upper part of the river is mainly served by the route 367 (chemin du rang Saint-Paul), by the chemin du rang Saint-Antoine and the route de la Traverse du 5e Rang.

The main economic activities in the sector are forestry and agricultural activities.

The surface of the Rondeau River (except the rapids zones) is generally frozen from the beginning of December to the end of March, but the safe circulation on the ice is generally made from the end of December to the beginning of March.

Geography 
The Rondeau River originates from Bleu Lake (elevation ) which is enclosed between the mountains. The southeast shore of this lake has a resort vocation, located in a forest area in the northwest part of the municipality of Saint-Léonard-de-Portneuf. This lake is mainly fed by the outlet of Lac du Canard (coming from the southwest) and the outlet of Lac Vert (coming from the northwest).

  to the northeast, passing through the hamlet of Allen's Mill, collecting the discharge (coming from the north) from a small unidentified lake, going east, then again branching northeast to a bend in the river;
  to the east, branching southeast, to Trudel stream (coming from the north);
  south to the route 367 bridge;
  first south, southeast, then south again, to its mouth.
From there, the current descends on  generally south and southwest following the course of the Sainte-Anne River, until on the northwest shore of the St. Lawrence River.

Toponymy 
The toponym "Rondeau River" was formalized on May 2, 1985, at the Place Names Bank of the Commission de toponymie du Québec.

See also 

 List of rivers of Quebec

References

Bibliography

External links 
 

Rivers of Capitale-Nationale